Richard Golz (born 5 June 1968) is a German former professional footballer who played as a goalkeeper. He had a long career in German football, spending the vast majority with Hamburger SV and SC Freiburg. Today, he is a sport director of German fourth-tier Altona 93.

Playing career

Born in Berlin, Golz was discovered by Hamburger SV youth coach Gerd-Volker Schock and joined the club in 1985, studying at the Gymnasium Heidberg, like many HSV youngsters. He made his professional debut on 1 August 1987 in a 5–2 defeat to Schalke 04 and managed five appearances in his debut season. By the October of his second season, he had claimed the number one jersey that he would retain for almost a decade.

Although the club did not manage to win any trophies during this period, Golz achieved several top five finishes here and enjoyed European action in the 1991–92 UEFA Cup where Hamburger SV reached the third round (their exit at the hands of Sigma Olomouc was a doubly unhappy occasion for Golz as he was sent off).

In the 1997–98 season Golz lost his first choice position, as Hamburg signed Hans-Jörg Butt. Golz was relegated to reserve status at this point, making just one final appearance for the HSV on 31 January 1998 in a 3–0 defeat at Bayern Munich. After over ten years and 273 Bundesliga games, Golz's time at Hamburg was up and he moved onto newly promoted SC Freiburg.

Golz immediately got back into first team action with his new club, as they enjoyed four years at the top level, before sliding back down to the 2. Bundesliga in 2002. However, Golz was an ever-present as they immediately won promotion back as champions. He and the club survived for two further seasons before again being relegated in 2005.

The following year saw Golz activate a clause he had previously put in his contract guaranteeing him a one-year position in the club's marketing department. He made only six further appearances for the team as new signing Alexander Walke replaced him after 219 games for the club.

Golz added to his new off the field role by gaining the German Football Association football coaching licence (A-list), which built upon the sports management open university course he had competed in 2000. However, his position within the club was not extended beyond the initial year and he seized the chance to reactivate his playing career by joining top flight Hannover 96 in August 2006 as a backup goalkeeper, but he made no appearances until his contract ran out in 2008.

Coaching career
On 4 June 2013, he was appointed as the goalkeeping coach of Hertha BSC. From 2016 until 2017, Golz was a goalkeeper coach of the Romania national team. On 5 May 2020, he was appointed as a sports director of Altona 93, a side from the fourth-tier German Regionalliga Nord.

Honours

Player
SC Freiburg
2. Bundesliga: 2002–03

References

External links
  
 

1968 births
Living people
German footballers
Footballers from Berlin
Association football goalkeepers
Germany under-21 international footballers
Bundesliga players
2. Bundesliga players
Hamburger SV players
SC Freiburg players
Hannover 96 players